The Andean marsupial tree frog (Gastrotheca riobambae), also known as the Riobamba marsupial frog or Riobamba pouched frog, is a species of frog in the family Hemiphractidae. It is endemic to Ecuador. The species is confined to the Andes and the inter-Andean valleys, from Imbabura south to Chimborazo. They live in an altitude of 2,200-3,500 meters above sea-level. The Andean marsupial tree frog's habitat varies from the montane forests to the dry rocky hillsides, and from the agave plants to the corn fields. Once a common species, it is threatened by severe habitat loss.

It has a broad, depressed body. Skin is smooth above but granulated below.

Within this genus, the males transfer the eggs from the female's cloaca to their dorsal pouch till they reach development at the tadpole stage. It takes approximately five to six weeks that the eggs stay in the female's pouch. Once they reach the stage as tadpoles, they continue their development in water, and go through metamorphosis in a few weeks time.

Gastrotheca riobambae are sometimes kept as pets.

References

External links

Images at ARKive

Gastrotheca
Amphibians of Ecuador
Amphibians of the Andes
Endemic fauna of Ecuador
Taxonomy articles created by Polbot
Amphibians described in 1913